APJ Abdul Kalam Technological University (KTU) is a state public technological university headquartered at Thiruvananthapuram, Kerala, India.

KTU offers professional degrees in engineering, technology, and management-related streams and has advanced courses and syllabi compared to its predecessor universities in the state. Named after the Indian aerospace scientist and statesman A. P. J. Abdul Kalam in 2015, it is both a teaching and an affiliation university, with more than 170 affiliated colleges and over 160,000 students enrolled, having jurisdiction over the 14 districts of Kerala.

KTU is an AICTE (All India Council for Technical Education) and UGC (University Grants Commission) approved university that offers undergraduate, postgraduate, and doctorate academic degrees in Bachelor of Technology (BTech), Bachelor of Architecture (BArch), Bachelor of Design (BDes), Bachelor of Vocational Education (BVoc), Bachelor of Hotel Management and Catering Technology (BHMCT), Master of Technology (MTech), Master of Architecture (MArch), Master of Business Administration (MBA), Master of Computer Applications (MCA), and Doctor of Philosophy (PhD). The language of instruction is English.

It is a relatively new and reformed technological university, with its first batch enrolled in the academic year 2015-16.

History 
KTU was established by the Government of Kerala through an Ordinance on 21 May 2014. Kuncheria P. Isaac, a former Member Secretary of the All India Council for Technical Education was appointed as the first Vice-Chancellor of the university on 1 September 2014, and M. Abdul Rahman, former All India Council for Technical Education Director, was appointed as the first Pro-Vice-Chancellor. Classes for the first batch under KTU began on 1 August 2015.

List of Vice Chancellors of KTU

See also 
 List of engineering colleges in Kerala

References

External links
 Official website

 
Engineering colleges in Thiruvananthapuram
Educational institutions established in 2014
All India Council for Technical Education
2014 establishments in Kerala
Technological University
Universities in Thiruvananthapuram